Gideon Kimbrell is an entrepreneur and software engineer, best known as the Co-Founder/Co-Chairman of the company InList. He co-founded InList in 2013 after agreeing to a creative partnership with Fueled's founder Rameet Chawla and validating the initial concept with prominent nightlife executive Michael Capponi.

Early life and education
Kimbrell was born in Montana in the United States. Due to accelerated home education, Kimbrell excelled through the education system and began to attend university at the age of 15. At the age of 16, Kimbrell launched and programmed his first website. The controversial website was used to rate photos of students attending Southern Adventist University.

Career
After finishing his education, Kimbrell worked for a number of large organizations, including Fortune 100 companies.

In 2013, Kimbrell began researching the idea of launching an app for a concierge service for making event reservations instantly. The idea was based on a mobile app, and Kimbrell estimated that it would cost more than $200,000 to develop. After considering a number of options, Kimbrell and Fueled decided to launch the idea as a creative partnership. He used this alternative financing method prior to venture capital and other funding options.

Kimbrell is primarily a specialist software developer and has been regularly featured in the media discussing topics regarding development. When launching various mobile app projects, Kimbrell has spoken about outsourcing and how to avoid its common pitfalls. When launching InList, Kimbrell spoke to Michael Capponi about the projects' potential. After discussions, it was decided that Capponi would be involved in the project. Kimbrell discussed that this partnership with Capponi greatly assisted a number of negotiations, including the purchase of InList.com.

As the Co-Founder/Co-Chairman and lead technologist of InList, Kimbrell was featured in Forbes in January 2014. He discussed various management styles and how business leaders and managers can learn from the techniques used by software engineers. He has also written for both Mashable and Inc Magazine.

In November 2014, Kimbrell and Michael Capponi successfully raised $3 million for InList from Star Capital. Subsequently, InList's launch party at the newly renovated Shelborne Wyndham Grand South Beach drew notables such as Alesso, Jamie Foxx and Omar Benson Miller.

Speaking
Kimbrell is a member of the Young Entrepreneur Council along with Psychology Today and American Express' Open Forum. He regularly writes and speaks as a member of all three foundations.

References

1984 births
Living people
American technology chief executives
Businesspeople from Montana